Ayoub Zolfagari (born 1959 in Tabriz, Iran) is a retired Iranian professional football player and manager. He played all of his professional career for Tractor.

References

External links 
 Ayoub Zolfagari at IRIFF
 Ayoub Zolfagari  at Iran Pro League website

1959 births
Living people
Iranian footballers
Tractor S.C. players
Sportspeople from Tabriz
Association footballers not categorized by position